The 2016–17 Winthrop Eagles men's basketball team represented Winthrop University during the 2016–17 NCAA Division I men's basketball season. The Eagles, led by fifth-year head coach Pat Kelsey, played their home games at the Winthrop Coliseum in Rock Hill, South Carolina as members of the Big South Conference. They finished the season 26–7, 15–3 in Big South play to finish in a tie for the regular season Big South championship. As the No. 1 seed in the Big South tournament, they defeated Charleston Southern, Gardner–Webb, and Campbell to win the tournament championship. As a result, they received the conference's automatic bid to the NCAA tournament, their first bid since 2010. In the NCAA Tournament, they lost in the first round to Butler.

After the season, head coach Pat Kelsey initially left Winthrop on March 21, 2017 to take the head coaching job at UMass, but backed out 2 days later for personal reasons and returned to the program.

Previous season
The Eagles finished the 2015–16 season 23–9, 13–5 in Big South play to win a share of the regular season conference championship. They defeated Presbyterian and Gardner–Webb to advance to the championship game of the Big South tournament where they lost to UNC Asheville. Despite the regular season conference title and 23 wins, they did not participate in a postseason tournament.

Roster

Schedule and results

|-
!colspan=9 style=| Regular season

|-
!colspan=9 style=| Big South tournament

|-
!colspan=9 style=| NCAA tournament

References

Winthrop Eagles men's basketball seasons
Winthrop
Winthrop
2017 in sports in South Carolina
2016 in sports in South Carolina